The China Railways JF18 (解放18, Jiěfàng, "liberation") class steam locomotive was a class of 2-8-2 steam locomotives operated by the China Railway, built by the American Locomotive Company in the United States in 1914.

The original owner of these locomotives is unknown. After the Japanese established the puppet state of Manchukuo, the privately owned railways in the territory of Manchukuo were nationalised to create the Manchukuo National Railway, which designated these the Mikai (ミカイ) class, becoming Mikana (ミカナ) class after the classification reform of 1938.

After the end of the Pacific War, these locomotives were passed on to the Republic of China Railway. After the establishment of the People's Republic of China, China Railways designated them ㄇㄎ18 (MK18) class in 1951. They were subsequently redesignated 解放18 (JF18) class in 1959, and were retired in 1975.

References

2-8-2 locomotives
ALCO locomotives
Railway locomotives introduced in 1914
 Scrapped locomotives
Steam locomotives of China
Standard gauge locomotives of China
Rolling stock of Manchukuo
Freight locomotives